Eremophila strongylophylla is a flowering plant in the figwort family, Scrophulariaceae and is endemic to Western Australia. It is a small shrub with distinctive round leaves, yellowish new growth and purple flowers which are white inside. It is similar to Eremophila mackinlayi and Eremophila hygrophana but distinguished from them by characteristics including leaf shape, and the type of hairs on its leaves and branches.

Description
The branches are rough due to raised leaf bases.

The outside surface of the sepals has similar yellowish hairs to those on the leaves while the inside surface has mostly glandular hairs. The petal tube is purple on the outside and white with purple spots inside the tube. The outer surface of the petal tube is covered with star-shaped hairs, but the inner surface of the lobes is glabrous while the inside of the tube is filled with long, woolly hairs. The 4 stamens are fully enclosed in the petal tube.

Taxonomy and naming
Eremophila strongylophylla was first formally described by Ferdinand von Mueller in 1876 and the description was published in Fragmenta phytographiae Australiae. The specific epithet means "round-leaved".

Distribution and habitat
This eremophila occurs in areas between the Overlander Roadhouse and Carnarvon in the Carnarvon, Gascoyne, Murchison and Pilbara biogeographic regions. It grows in red, sandy soil near watercourses and along drainage lines.

Conservation
This species is classified as "not threatened" by the Western Australian Government Department of Parks and Wildlife.

Use in horticulture
The most attractive forms of E. strogylophylla are those with gold tips on the new leaves but all are small shrubs with lilac-coloured to purple flowers over an extended period. It can be propagated by cuttings but plants grown on their own roots have a tendency to sucker. If this characteristic is not desirable, grafting onto Myoporum rootstock is preferred. The plant will grow in most soils in a sunny or part-shaded position and only requires the occasional watering during a long drought. It can tolerate light frosts but a heavy frost may cause damage that can be pruned away after winter, rejuvenating the shrub.

References

strongylophylla
Eudicots of Western Australia
Endemic flora of Western Australia
Plants described in 1876
Taxa named by Ferdinand von Mueller